Fabrixx is a German television series. The show centers around the story of German youth in Stuttgart.

See also
List of German television series

External links
 

2000 German television series debuts
2005 German television series endings
German children's television series
German-language television shows
Das Erste original programming